Broadcast Film Critics Association Awards 2000 may refer to:

 5th Critics' Choice Awards, the fifth Critics' Choice Awards ceremony that took place in 2000
 6th Critics' Choice Awards, the sixth Critics' Choice Awards ceremony that took place in 2001 and which honored the best in film for 2000